Onitsha Market Literature refers to a number of pamphlets, books and other publications sold at the Onitsha Market in Nigeria in the 1950s and 1960s. Much of it was written in pidgin English. This form of literature is now interesting to researchers as a secondary source of information about social conditions of the time; general readers can appreciate it for its creative use of colorful, non-standard English as well as its often racy plotlines.

References

Further reading
 Kurt Thometz, ed., Life Turns Man Up and Down: High Life, Useful Advice, and Mad English, New York, Pantheon, 2001 - facsimile reproductions of selected Onitsha market literature pamphlets

External links
 Onitsha Market Literature, ku.edu.
 Related Resources. Bibliography of writings on Nigerian market literature: a sequel., ku edu.
 Onitsha Market Literature, indiana.edu.
 The Onitsha Market Literature Phenomenon, nigeriafirst.org.

Nigerian literature
Onitsha
Pamphlets
 Chapbooks